Hima Cement Limited (HCL) is a cement manufacturer in Uganda. It is a subsidiary of the Holcim Group, a building materials manufacturer headquartered in Switzerland, with subsidiaries in over 80 countries.

Location
The main factories of HCL are located in Hima in Kasese District in the Western Region of Uganda. The geographical coordinates of the main factory are: 0°17'21.0"N, 30°10'45.0"E (Latitude:0.289167; Longitude:30.179167).

In 2018, HCL opened a new US$40 million cement factory along the Tororo-Mbale-Soroti Road, with production capacity of  annually, to match the output from Kasese District. The new factory will increase total output for Hima Cement Uganda Limited to  annually. The Tororo factory of Hima Cement Limited came online in 2018.

Overview
As of 2019, HCL was the second-largest manufacturer of cement in Uganda, producing an estimated 2 million metric tonnes annually, accounting for 28 percent on national output. 20 percent of Hima's production was exported to South Sudan, the Democratic Republic of the Congo and Rwanda.

In addition to the factories in Hima and Tororo, HCL maintains a corporate office in Twed Towers, Kafu Road, in Kampala and two warehouses, one in Kampala's industrial area and the other in the eastern border town of Tororo. HCL also owns a limestone quarry at Dura in the Kamwenge District, which supplies the limestone used in cement manufacturing. The quarry is estimated to contain enough limestone to sustain current production capacity until 2036.

History
In 1994, the parastatal formerly known as Uganda Cement Industries was privatized by the government of Uganda. It was split into Tororo Cement and Hima Cement. The two companies were acquired by different investors. Tororo Cement eventually became Tororo Cement Limited. In 1999, the French conglomerate LaFarge acquired 100 percent shareholding in Hima Cement and re-branded the company into Hima Cement Limited. Production capacity at the HCL's factories increased steadily from the 20,000 metric tonnes in 1994 to 850,000 tonnes in 2011. In 2018, total production capacity at both factories in Hima and Tororo, in Uganda was  annually.

Supply contracts
In July 2017, HCL signed a memorandum of understanding with the China Communications Construction Company to supply 120,000 metric tonnes of cement for three public projects as follows: 1. Over the next five years, HCL will supply 30,000 metric tonnes of cement (60 percent of the project requirements) for the ongoing expansion of the Entebbe International Airport. 2. Over the next three years, HCL will supply 60,000 metric tonnes of cement for the Mubende-Kakumiro-Kagadi Road. 3. Over the next three years, HCL will supply 30,000 metric tonnes of cement for the Tororo-Mbale-Soroti Road. 4. Hima Cement has been the largest supplier of cement during the construction of the 600 megawatts Karuma Hydroelectric Power Station, between 2013 and 2020.

Ownership
HCL is a subsidiary of Holcim, a large Swiss-based buildings material conglomerate. The table below illustrates the shareholders in Hima Cement Limited.

References

Cement companies of Uganda
Kasese District
Manufacturing companies established in 1994
1994 establishments in Uganda
Holcim Group